Namitha I Love You is a 2011 Kannada-language comedy drama starring Namitha in the lead role. Srikanth, Prithviraj, Tennis Krishna and Bullet Prakash play the male lead roles. Actress Jayanthi also plays an important role. The film is directed by M. Jayasimha Reddy. He is also the writer and music director of the film. M. Raviteja Reddy has produced the film. The film was simultaneously shot in Telugu. The Kannada version released on 10 June 2011.

Cast 

 Namitha as Namitha
 Gollahalli Shivaprasad
 Pruthviraj
 Tennis Krishna
 Bank Janardhan
 Akshata Shetty
 Shobhina
 Kavitha
 Anu

Reception

Critical response 

B S Srivani from Deccan Herald wrote "At the future of contemporary college life, education relegated to the trash bin and the glorification of lust above all natural emotions. Families and sane people are advised to skip this insult to cinema".

References

2011 films
2010s Kannada-language films